Guioa melanopoda is a species of plant in the family Sapindaceae. It is endemic to West Papua (Indonesia).

References

melanopoda
Endemic flora of Western New Guinea
Trees of New Guinea
Vulnerable plants
Taxonomy articles created by Polbot